Karachi FM is a radio station broadcasting on 96.0 FM in Karachi, Pakistan. The radio station is owned and operated by Vectracom Broadcasting Services (Pvt.) Ltd.

History

The station was established in 2004 as Radioactive 96 FM. It was owned by Riffat Siddiqi. The station changed names to Karachi FM in 2013.

See also 

 List of radio stations in Pakistan
 City FM 89
 Radio Pakistan

References 

Radio stations in Pakistan
Mass media in Karachi